The Comoros requires its residents to register their motor vehicles and display vehicle registration plates. Current plates are European standard 520 mm × 110 mm, and use French stamping dies.

References

Weblinks 
License plates of the Comoros at Francoplaque

Comoros
Transport in the Comoros
Comoros transport-related lists